Kollin is a given name and surname. It may refer to:

Kollin Rice, American attorney and politician
Kollin Johannsen, musician, member of American band The Colourist
Erik August Kollin (1836–1901), Finnish goldsmith, silversmith and Fabergé workmaster
Toralv Kollin Markussen (1895–1973), Norwegian politician, member of the Communist Party

See also
Colin (disambiguation)
Collin (disambiguation)